Arthur Churchill Bartholomew (21 February 1846 – 29 March 1940) was an English cricketer and schoolmaster.

He was educated at Marlborough College and Trinity College, Oxford. He played a few first-class matches for Oxford University over three seasons from 1866 to 1868, with a highest score of 54 in the victory over Surrey in 1867. He was regarded as one of the best cover point fieldsmen of the day.

He became an assistant master at Brighton College, and later was headmaster of preparatory schools at Great Marlow and Reading. At the time of his death he was the oldest surviving Oxbridge cricket Blue.

References

External links
 
 

1846 births
1940 deaths
English cricketers
Oxford University cricketers
People educated at Marlborough College
Alumni of Trinity College, Oxford
Schoolteachers from Devon
People from North Devon (district)